Katrina Von Sass (born January 25, 1972) is a Canadian former volleyball player.

Career
Von Sass represented Canada at the 1996 Summer Olympics.

Personal life
Von Sass and her sister Betina were in a relationship with the spiritual teacher John de Ruiter. Thet later sued him for financial support.

References

1972 births
Living people
Canadian women's volleyball players
Olympic volleyball players of Canada
Sportspeople from Oakville, Ontario
Volleyball players at the 1996 Summer Olympics